Flagstaff commonly refers to:

 Flagpole, a staff for displaying a flag
 Flagstaff, Arizona, the county seat of Coconino County, Arizona

Flagstaff may also refer to:

United States
 Flagstaff station, in Flagstaff, Arizona
 United States Naval Observatory Flagstaff Station, in Flagstaff, Arizona
 Flagstaff Mountain (Boulder County, Colorado), a peak near Boulder, Colorado
 Flagstaff Mountain (Stevens County, Washington), a peak near Northport, Washington
 Flagstaff, Maine, a submerged former town 
 Flagstaff Lake (Maine), on the Dead River
 Flagstaff (Mandeville, Louisiana), a historic home  listed on the National Register of Historic Places in St. Tammany Parish

Australia
 Flagstaff Gardens, a park in Melbourne
 Flagstaff railway station, Melbourne
 Flagstaff, Victoria

Canada
 Flagstaff County, a municipal district in Alberta

Ghana
 The Flagstaff House, Accra; residence and office of the President of Ghana

Hong Kong
 Flagstaff House, the home to the Commander of British Forces in Hong Kong and now home to a museum of teaware

New Zealand
 Flagstaff (Otago), a hill above Dunedin
 Flagstaff, Hamilton, a suburb

Pakistan 
 Flagstaff House or Quaid-e-Azam House, Karachi; home of Muhammad Ali Jinnah, Governor General of Pakistan and founder of modern Pakistan

South Africa
 Flagstaff, Eastern Cape

See also
 Flagstaff Hill (disambiguation)
 Flagstaff Lake (disambiguation)